Aap Ki Kachehri... Kiran Ke Saath is an Indian television reality show about real-life situations. The series premiered on the television channel, STAR Plus and is a platform for settling disputes between consenting individuals. The series is based on real-life disputes. The Indian social activist and retired Indian police officer, Kiran Bedi plays the role of the body officially appointed to settle a dispute.

Season 1 started airing from 1 December 2008  and ended on 14 March 2009 airing Monday through Friday. Season 2 started airing 5 August 2009 and ran through  2 October 2009. Season 3 ran from 30 April 2011 to 14 August 2011.

References

StarPlus original programming
2008 Indian television series debuts
Indian reality television series
2011 Indian television series endings
Indian legal television series